The 2013 Euro Beach Soccer League (EBSL) is an annual European competition in beach soccer. The competitions allows national teams to compete in beach soccer in a league format over the summer months. Each season ends with a Superfinal, deciding the competition winner.

This season, there are twelve teams each participating in two divisions in each Stage (there are a record number of five Stages this year) that will face each other in a round-robin system. Division A consists of the 12 top teams in Europe based on the BSWW European Ranking. Division B consists of 12 of the lower ranked teams and new entries to the competition. Each division has its own regulations and competition format.

Each team competes in two preliminary events to see their points obtained accumulated into an overall ranking that will determine the teams that qualify for the Superfinal. Due to the newly expanded format this season, the top eight teams of Division A (including the individual Stage winners and the host team Spain) will play in the Superfinal in Torredembarra, Spain from 8–11 August. The top seven teams of Division B (including the individual Stage winners) plus the worst team in Division A will play in the Promotional Final to try to earn promotion to Division A for the 2014 season.

Once again this season, the Power Horse energy drink company is the main sponsor of the EBSL. The logo has been slightly modified to show this.

Eligible EBSL Teams 

The teams from Division A will compete for the Euro Beach Soccer League title while the teams from Division B will compete for promotion into next year's Division A.

Stage 1 Kyiv, Ukraine – May, 24 – 26

Participating nations

Final standings Division A

Schedule and results 
All kickoff times are of local time in Kyiv (UTC+03:00).

Individual awards 
MVP:  Bogusław Saganowski
Top Scorer:  Oleg Zborovskyi (6 goals)
Best Goalkeeper:  Vitalii Sydorenko

Total Goals 
53 goals were scored, for an average of 8.83 goals per match.

Stage 2 Terracina, Italy – June, 14 – 16

Participating nations

Final standings Division A Group 1

Final standings Division A Group 2

Final standings Division B 

Note: Although the Netherlands won their group, they were not automatically qualified for the Superfinal, as Portugal had the better group-winner record.

Schedule and results 
All kickoff times are of local time in Terracina (UTC+02:00).

Individual awards 
MVP:  Belchior
Top Scorer:  Alan,  Belchior,  Oleg Zborovskyi,  Patrick Ax (4 goals) 
Best Goalkeeper:  Stefano Spada

Total Goals 
126 goals were scored, for an average of 7 goals per match.

Stage 3 Valence, France – June, 21 – 23

Participating nations

Final standings Division A

Final standings Division B

Schedule and results 
All kickoff times are of local time in Valence (UTC+02:00).

Individual awards 
MVP:  Dejan Stankovic 
Top Scorer:  Dejan Stankovic (8 goals) 
Best Goalkeeper:  Valentin Jaeggy

Total Goals 
105 goals were scored, for an average of 8.75 goals per match.

Stage 4 The Hague, Netherlands – July, 19 – 21

Participating nations

Final standings Division A

Final standings Division B

Schedule and results 
All kickoff times are of local time in The Hague (UTC+02:00).

Individual awards 
MVP:  Patrick Ax
Top Scorer:  Bogusław Saganowski (6 goals)
Best Goalkeeper:  Frank van der Geest

Total Goals 
87 goals were scored, for an average of 7.25 goals per match.

Stage 5 Moscow, Russia – August, 2 – 4

Participating nations

Final standings Division A

Schedule and results 
All kickoff times are of local time in Moscow (UTC+04:00).

Individual awards 
MVP:  Ilya Leonov
Top Scorer:  Llorenç Gómez (6 goals)
Best Goalkeeper:  Sascha Penke

Total Goals 
31 goals were scored, for an average of 5.17 goals per match.

Cumulative standings 

Ranking & tie-breaking criteria: Division A – 1. Points earned 2. Goal difference 3. Goals scored | Division B – 1. Points earned 2. Highest stage placement 3. Goal difference 4. Goals scored.

Division A

Division B

EBSL Superfinal and Promotional Final – Torredembarra, Spain – August, 8 – 11

Superfinal and Promotional Final Divisions 

The Divisions for the Euro Beach Soccer League Superfinal have now been determined. The teams from Division A will compete for the Euro Beach Soccer League title while the teams from Division B will compete for promotion into next year's Division A. The division of the Superfinal and Promotional Final Groups are based on how the cumulative standings for Divisions A and B finish. In Division A, Group A will have teams that finish in places 1, 4, 6 and 7, while Group B will have teams that finish in places 2, 3, 5 and 8. In Division B, Group A will have teams that finish in places 4, 5, 6 and the last-place team in Division A, while Group B will have teams that finish in places 1, 2, 3 and 7.

Division A (Superfinal)

Group A Standings

Group B Standings

Schedule and results 
All kickoff times are of local time in Torredembarra (UTC+02:00).

Round-Robin

Seventh-place Match

Fifth-place Match

Third-place Match

Championship final match

Individual awards 
 MVP:  Ilya Leonov
 Top Scorer:  Dejan Stankovic (9 goals)
 Best Goalkeeper:  Francisco Donaire

Final Division A Standing

Division B (Promotional Final)

Group A Standings

Group B Standings

Schedule and results 
All kickoff times are of local time in Torredembarra (UTC+02:00).

Round-Robin

Seventh-place Match

Fifth-place Match

Third-place Match

Promotional Final Match

Final Division B Standing

Total Goals 
235 goals were scored, for an average of 7.34 goals per match.

See also 
 Beach soccer

References

External links 
 Beach Soccer Worldwide
 Eurosport TV
 Power Horse Energy Drink, the official EBSL sponsor

Euro Beach Soccer League
2013 in beach soccer